Cuervo is Spanish surname literally meaning raven. Notable people with the surname include:

Alma Cuervo (born 1951), American actress
Cayetana Guillén Cuervo (born 1969) Spanish actress and TV presenter
Dark Cuervo, aka Jaime Ignacio Tirado Correa (born 1974), Mexican wrestler
Eduardo Cuervo (born 1977), Mexican actor 
Fernando Guillén Cuervo, (born 1963) Spanish actor, film director and scriptwriter
Gemma Cuervo, (born 1936) Spanish actress
Rufino José Cuervo, a Colombian writer, linguist and philologist

See also
El Cuervo (disambiguation)

Corvo (disambiguation)
Corvus (disambiguation)

Surnames from nicknames